Benjamin James Dwarshuis (born 23 June 1994) is an Australian cricketer. He made his international debut for the Australia cricket team in April 2022.

Career
He made his List A debut for New South Wales in the 2016–17 Matador BBQs One-Day Cup on 7 October 2016.

In January 2018, he was named in Australia's Twenty20 International (T20I) squad for the 2017–18 Trans-Tasman Tri-Series. Later the same month, he was bought by the Kings XI Punjab in the 2018 IPL auction. In March 2021, Dwarshuis was signed by Worcestershire County Cricket Club to play in the 2021 t20 Blast tournament in England.

On 13 September 2021, Dwarshuis was included in the Delhi Capitals squad for the second phase of the 2021 IPL in the United Arab Emirates, as a replacement player for Chris Woakes. In January 2022, in the 2021–22 Big Bash League season, Dwarshuis took his maiden five-wicket haul in T20 cricket.

In February 2022, Dwarshuis was named in Australia's Twenty20 International (T20I) squad for their one-off match against Pakistan. He made his T20I debut on 5 April 2022, for Australia against Pakistan.

References

External links
 

1994 births
Living people
Australian cricketers
Australia Twenty20 International cricketers
New South Wales cricketers
Sydney Sixers cricketers
Punjab Kings cricketers
Worcestershire cricketers
Cricketers from Sydney
Birmingham Phoenix cricketers